Enzastaurin is a synthetic bisindolylmaleimide with potential antineoplastic activity. Binding to the ATP-binding site, enzastaurin selectively inhibits protein kinase C beta, an enzyme involved in the induction of vascular endothelial growth factor (VEGF)-stimulated neo-angiogenesis. This agent may decrease tumor blood supply, preventing growth.

Trials 
In 2013 it failed a phase III clinical trial for lymphoma.

In 2022, there is an upcoming initial trial called PREVEnt to look into the effectiveness of Enzastaurin for the treatment of Vascular Elhers-Danlos syndrome (vEDS).

References

External links
 Enzastaurin hydrochloride, National Institutes of Health

2-Pyridyl compounds
Piperidines
Bisindolylmaleimides
Orphan drugs